Lindra  may refer to:
 Lindra (skipper), a genus of skippers in the family Hesperiidae
 Lindra (fungus), a genus of fungi in the family Lulworthiaceae